The Saba is a river in Leningrad Oblast, Russia, a left tributary of the Luga. Its origin is southwestern portion of Krashogorskoye Lake. Main tributaries include:
Left: Elemenka, Sabitsa, Syaberka, Kerina, Uzminka, Luzhinka
Right: Sarka, Belka

References

Rivers of Leningrad Oblast